Ministry of Justice is the state government ministry of Kaduna State, it is concerned with judicial and prosecutorial activities within the state. The Ministry of Justice control the courts system and the prosecuting offices. Aisha Dikko is the Attorney General.

Responsibilities 
The Ministry of Justice has the responsibilities on legislative initiatives and their presentation of Knesset and its committees., the ministry works with security department to make sure law and order is maintained to also controls administration of justice in the state.

References 

Ministries of Kaduna State
Justice ministries
Kaduna